Premier Farnell Ltd is a distributor of products for electronic system design, maintenance and repair throughout Europe, North America and Asia Pacific, with operations in 36 countries and trading in over 100. In October 2016, the firm was purchased by Avnet in a deal valued at approximately £691 million.

History
The firm was founded by Alan Farnell and Arthur Woffenden in 1939 in Leeds, England as A.C. Farnell Limited. It was first listed on the London Stock Exchange in 1966. The company was based next to Wetherby railway station, later moving into larger offices on the town's Sandbeck Industrial Estate, and in 1995, into offices in Armley.

In 1995 it acquired Combined Precision Components. As it focused on distribution, its manufacturing operations were sold the same year. In 1996 it bought the United States distributor, Premier Industrial Corporation, and changed its name to Premier Farnell.

In 2001 the firm acquired Buck & Hickman, a company which it sold in 2007. In 2006, the firm sold Kent, its specialist automotive consumables business.

In the mid-2000s, the firm developed from a catalogues and trade counter business into an e-commerce operation, under the direction of Harriet Green, CEO, who joined the business in 2006.

In 2007 the firm launched its Greater China business, Premier Electronics, with a warehouse and distribution centre in WaiGaoQiao.

Towards the end of 2008 the group began the closure of Cadillac Electric, which was part of the group's Industrial Products division. During the course of 2008 the group acquired Hynetic Electronics, an Indian distributor, and in early 2009 it acquired Microdis Electronics, an electronics distributor based in Poland. In September 2009, it announced the acquisition of CadSoft Computer GmbH, developer of EAGLE electronic design automation software, which it later sold in 2016. In March 2016, the group sold its Akron Brass subsidiary to IDEX Corporation for $224.2 million. From time to time, Premier Farnell shares were a constituent of the FTSE 250 Index.

On 17 October 2016, American company Avnet completed its acquisition of Premier Farnell in a deal valued at approximately £691 million, leading to delisting of Premier Farnell shares. In 2019 the business was rebranded as Farnell, although the company's legal name continues to be Premier Farnell Limited.

Structure and operations

Premier Farnell Limited is a holding company with numerous subsidiaries in Europe and Asia.

The group trades globally under the following names:

element14 group

 Farnell element14 in the UK and Europe
 Newark element14 in the United States, Canada and Mexico
 element14 in Australia, New Zealand, Hong Kong, India, Malaysia, China and Singapore
 element14 community, an online information hub and forum for electrical engineers.

Other brands
 CPC in the UK
 Shenzhen Embest Technology

Products
, Premier Farnell stocks 950,000 products across its regional warehouses. It also sells about half of the Raspberry Pi computers distributed worldwide.

Awards

 ECMOD Direct Commerce Award for the best online business B2B, 2012 
BiTC Corporate Responsibility Index – Platinum status, 2012 
Ethisphere Institute – World's Most Ethical Companies List, 2012

References

External links
 

Electronic component distributors
Distribution companies of the United Kingdom
Companies based in Leeds
Electronics companies established in 1939
1939 establishments in the United Kingdom
Wetherby
2016 mergers and acquisitions
Companies formerly listed on the London Stock Exchange